The 2010 Weber State Wildcats football team represented Weber State University for the 2010 NCAA Division I FCS football season under head coach Ron McBride. The Wildcats finished the regular season with a record of 6–5, 5–3 in Big Sky play to finish in a  3 way tie for 3rd place.

Schedule

References

Weber State
Weber State Wildcats football seasons
Weber State Wildcats football